Aru K Verma, aka Aru Verma is an Indian actor.

Early life
Born in Lucknow, Aru K. Verma as a child, moved all over north India with his family, including to cities like Lucknow, Ambala, Karnal and Dehradun, where he was completing parts of his education and finished his schooling from Mount St. Marys,  Delhi.

Career 
Actor played the role of Shah Rukh Khan's best friend in Jab Harry Met Sejal and shed 30 kilos for his role. Aru was inspired by Shah Rukh Khan to become fit for his role. He appeared in a Sony TV show The Drama Company

Filmography

Films

Web series

References

External links

Living people
Male actors from Lucknow
Indian male film actors
Male actors in Hindi cinema
Indian mechanical engineers
Indian acting coaches
Year of birth missing (living people)